The Machrihanish Coalfield is a coalfield on the Kintyre peninsula in southwest Scotland. It is one of the smallest British coalfields. With the exception of a thin coal beneath the Lyoncross Limestone in the overlying Upper Limestone Formation, all of the coal-bearing strata are found within the  Limestone Coal Formation, a subdivision of the Clackmannan Group; all being strata of Namurian age. There are numerous seams of which the Main Coal is the principal one, being some 3 to 4m thick. A further, higher seam known as the Kilkivan Coal has also been worked. The full sequence is:
Cannel Coal
Kilkivan Coal
Main Coal
Underfoot Coal
Mid Coal
Low Coal

Mining was taking place before the 16th century, largely in connection with a local sea-salt industry. Similar but very small scale activity also took place on the northeast coast of the nearby Isle of Arran. It continued at a low level through to the late 18th century when a new pit was sunk at the Argyll Colliery, ushering in the coalfield's busiest period which lasted until the closure of the mine in 1929, following a fire in 1925. Much of the coal was used to fuel the area's numerous distilleries. The coalfield was linked to Campbeltown by a canal from the late 18th century  and by a narrow-gauge railway at the end of the 19th century. Mining in the coalfield continued after the opening of a drift mine in 1946 through until 1967.

In 2010 Campbeltown born artist, Jan Nimmo, completed a documentary film, "The Road to Drumleman: Memories of the Argyll Colliery", which tells the story of Kintyre's last mine, the Argyll Colliery, through the narrative of some of the remaining miners.

References

Coal mining regions in Scotland
Geography of Argyll and Bute
Kintyre